Earl M. Wheby (December 12, 1915 – March 27, 2004) was an American football player and coach. He served as the head coach at the University of West Georgia from 1946 to 1947.

He played college football at Georgia Tech and played professionally for one season for the New York Yankees of the American Association in 1941

References

1915 births
2004 deaths
American football halfbacks
Georgia Tech Yellow Jackets football players
West Georgia Wolves football coaches
People from Princeton, West Virginia
Players of American football from West Virginia